Bucculatrix saccharata is a moth in the family Bucculatricidae. It is found in Colombia. It was first described by Edward Meyrick in 1915.

References

Bucculatricidae
Moths described in 1915
Taxa named by Edward Meyrick
Moths of South America